Sunny Side Up Tropical Festival is an annual summer music festival in Bali, Indonesia. The first edition was held on August 20, 2014, and it has since been held at Potato Head Beach Club. It is presented by PTT Family and Ismaya Live.

2014

The first edition of Sunny Side Up Tropical Festival took place on August 20, 2014 at Potato Head Beach Club, Bali.
Line-ups

Ellie Goulding
Azealia Banks
Banks
Goldroom 
Jessie Andrews
RAC 
Stevie G
Lady Flic

2015

The second edition of Sunny Side Up Fest was held on August 7, 2015.

Line-up

2016

The third edition of Sunny Side Up Fest was held in two days, August 13 and 14, 2016.
Line-up

August 13, 2016

<small>Reference:

August 14, 2016

<small>Reference:

2017
The 2017 edition of Sunny Side Up Festival was held in two days, August 11 and 12, 2017.
Line-up

Phoenix
Big Sean
Autograf
Charli XCX
Hot Chip 
Jonas Blue
Snakehips
Tokimonsta
TroyBoi
Wave Racer

2018
The 2018 edition was set to be held on two separate occasions on July 21 and August 12. But, it was announced that the second date was cancelled amid Lombok earthquake tragedy.
Line-up

July 21
Nick Murphy
Moon Boots
Basenji
HMGNC
Seabass
Dea
Stu McLellan
Khafira

August 12
Halsey
Niki

2019
The 2019 edition was held on August 24. The venue was moved to Manarai Beach House.
Line-up
Flume
Grace Carter
Tokimonsta
Yahtzel
Kai (Tantra)

References

Music festivals in Indonesia
Annual events in Indonesia
Music festivals established in 2014